HD 127726 is a binary star system in the northern constellation of Boötes.

References

External links
 HR 5433
 CCDM J14323+2641
 Image HD 127726

Boötes
127726
Binary stars
071094
A-type main-sequence stars
5433
Suspected variables
Durchmusterung objects